Jose C. Sering was a Filipino politician and sports executive.

Sering served as governor of Surigao del Norte from 1965 to 1980. He also established the Asian Amateur Athletic Association in 1973 and later served as the President of the Philippine Amateur Track and Field Association in two non-consecutive period; with the first tenure lasting from 1969 to 1981 and the second one from 1984 to 1991. Sering resigned from his PATAFA post in 1991 in favor of Go Teng Kok. In 1984, Sering was the acting director of the Project Gintong Alay government sports program. From 1985 to 1992, Sering was the President of the Philippine Olympic Committee

In around the 1990s, Sering underwent a quadruple bypass operation. On February 14, 2002, Sering suffered a heart attack at his residence in BF Homes in Parañaque. He was brought to the Alabang Medical Center in Muntinlupa where he was pronounced dead on arrival. He was aged 76 and was survived by his wife Socorro Limpot and their nine children, and his second wife Florencia Vargas (deceased) and their two children.

References

2002 deaths
20th-century Filipino politicians
Filipino sports executives and administrators
Governors of Surigao del Norte